David Macklin Braby Chapman (12 September 1855 – 24 March 1934) was a first-class cricketer. He was born at St. Paul's, Red River Colony, Rupert's Land (now part of Manitoba, Canada) and died at Hailsham, East Sussex, England.

David Chapman was educated at Corpus Christi College, Cambridge. He played two matches for Cambridge University in 1876–77. He later became ordained a clergyman, and was Vicar of Tonbridge from 1901 to 1931.

References

External links 
David Chapman at CricInfo

1855 births
1934 deaths
Canadian cricketers
Cricketers from Manitoba
Cambridge University cricketers
People of Rupert's Land
Alumni of Corpus Christi College, Cambridge